VPLP design (Van Peteghem Lauriot-Prévost) is a French-based naval architectural firm founded by Marc Van Peteghem and Vincent Lauriot-Prévost, responsible for designing some of the world's most innovative racing boats. Their designs presently hold many of the World Speed Sailing records.

History 
VPLP design is a French-based naval architecture firm founded by Marc Van Peteghem and Vincent Lauriot-Prévost. These two French nationals first met at Southampton College of Higher Education both having enrolled to study Yacht and Powercraft Design.

During their years at college Marc and Vincent forged a friendship that was later to be the catalyst for VPLP.  The company was formed in 1983 and first opened its doors in Marseilles with a focus on developing racing trimarans, which was a burgeoning niche market in the early 80's.

VPLP's initial project was to design a racing trimaran commissioned by skipper Vincent Levy for the 1984 OSTAR, (otherwise known as the English Transat). This  foiler baptized Gerard Lambert was the first in a long line of racing trimarans that created a name for the firm and established the young designers as innovators in the field of naval architecture.

This led to Yvon Fauconnier commissioning them to work with Phil Morrison in designing him a new 26 mtr trimaran. Fauconnier had just won the 1984 OSTAR in Umupro Jardin V designed by Morrison and built as Exmouth Challenge. The history of this front runner of modern trimaran design is detailed here
 and its more recent history here.

Morrison worked for several months in Marseilles with the two French designers at Fauconnier's request  and they credit him  with creating the idea that they successfully developed, using large volume floats (amas), as long as the main hull on a trimaran, instead of the smaller floats aided by foils that they had used before. This innovative design concept underlies all modern trimaran design because the much larger floats were more efficient.

VPLP designed their first cruising catamaran in 1984 for Lagoon, which was then a division of Jeanneau Techniques Avancées. The Lagoon 55 was the first in more than 240 cruising catamarans designed by VPLP. Lagoon is now part of the CNB division of Groupe Bénéteau and has produced more than 2000 catamarans with worldwide distribution. VPLP are the principal designers for the Lagoon fleet of sailing catamarans.

Evolution 

The offices moved to Paris, Bastille in 1985 to be closer their network of international clients.

In subsequent years, VPLP have structured the organization into three divisions to focus on separate sectors of the yacht market:
monohull and multihull racing yachts
series production sailing catamarans
luxury custom sailing catamarans

In 1996, VPLP opened a Racing Division in Vannes for proximity to many offshore racing teams. In 2008 VPLP opened a Refit and Brokerage Division in La Ciotat, which is a large service center with many shipyards catering for superyachts operating in the western Mediterranean sea.

In 2007 VPLP cooperated with French yacht designer Guillaume Verdier to penetrate the competitive IMOCA racing circuit. The performance of their first interactions Safran and Groupe Bel earned the VPLP-Verdier consortium a growing orderbook for racing monohulls.

Racing prototypes

Significant Race Results

Custom Raceboat Significant Boats

Custom Racing 

Since 1990, All of the VPLP boats are still undefeated at the Route du Rhum.

Production yachts 

VPLP worked on several serial production boats programs, including the Lagoon range from the beginning, The Outremer 5X and the power monohul dayboat Smartboat.

Experimental

Working

Annexes

Waterworld 
In 1994 VPLP designed the racing trimaran made famous by the movie Waterworld starring Kevin Costner. This second boat, although used for many of the close up scenes, was able to sail but was not capable of the speeds of the conventional trimaran.

Hydroptère 
In 1994 plans for an experimental Hydrofoil prototype was commissioned for Alain Thebault. The first Hydroptère was a  trimaran. In the following years four additional evolutions were built. In 2006 HYDROPTÈRE 5 was launched. This was the first boat to cross the  barrier (51 knots speed record set in 2009).

Groupama 3 
Groupama 3 and Franck Cammas
The prime design consideration for Groupama 3 was for a multihull which can be manipulated by a crew of ten people and not to make then LOA a defining characteristic thus Groupama 3 is not a maxi multihull!. It's a trimaran, which is also heavily inspired by Groupama 2, the  ORMA : with the adoption of foils and the installation of three rudders, with a wide, open cockpit and a proportionally moderate sail plan. As a result, we opted for a relatively small boat which is rather light, progressive and very reactive. The deck plan enables the crew to manoeuvre faster in order to adjust the sail area to changes in condition and hence permanently exploit the trimaran's potential.

As the record programme included above all the Jules Verne Trophy, it was necessary to take into account the `Southern ocean' parameter: the foils are far forward so that the boat is nose up, the freeboard is high to prevent the bow from burying, the height of the mast limits the trim changes. The balance when sailing is considerably safer than on a  Orma."

Groupama 3 was reconfigured for Franck Cammas to enter the 9th edition of the single handed Route du Rhum 2010 which started 31 October 2010. Groupama 3 was the first to finish in 9 days, 3 hours, 14 minutes and 47 seconds. The Route du Rhum takes place once every four years, is a single-handed race across the Atlantic starting in Saint-Malo, France and finishing in Pointe-à-Pitre, Guadeloupe in the Caribbean.

Maxi Banque Populaire V 
Banque Populaire V, the largest ocean racing trimaran in the world, was launched in August 2008 in Lorient (Brittany – France). Built at sites in Cherbourg, La Rochelle and Lorient, the construction of the maxi trimaran took 250 000 man hours of work, utilising a total workforce of some 170 people.
Under the leadership Pascal Bidégorry, skipper of the Banque Populaire trimarans since 2004, the crew of the Maxi Banque Populaire V has embarked on a campaign to beat some of the most prestigious ocean racing records.

For VPLP, the challenge consisted of designing a fully crewed, no compromise multihull, which is totally versatile but very high-performing, suitable for a mixed programme, which is always seaworthy but cutting edge and progressive, but which always preserves the safety of the crew on board.
At 40-metre (131 ft) trimaran, Maxi Banque Populaire V  is,  to date the largest ocean racing trimaran ever designed and built.

Pascal Bidégorry and his associate Ronan Lucas, the Director of the Team Banque Populaire, sought a design centred on a very specific idea:

“We wanted a big boat which would be able to sail fast safely but with a range of speeds, all that we knew we could master from a technological point of view”. Pascal Bidégorry skipper of Maxi Banque Populaire V.

BMW Oracle BOR 90 
BMW Oracle winner America's Cup 33 - Deed of Gift
The 33rd America's Cup was held under a strict Deed of Gift rules: The first team to win two out of three races is the winner of the 33rd America's Cup.
When it was proposed that the 33rd edition of the America's Cup would be contested with multihulls, BMW Oracle team immediately signed VPLP to their core design team

BMW Oracle Racing 'BOR 90, sailed as USA 17' the American challenger, representing the Golden Gate Yacht Club, won the 33rd America's Cup Match in Valencia, sweeping past the Swiss defender, Alinghi, to a 2–0 victory.

Race one, a windward - leeward course with  legs, saw BMW Oracle Racing's trimaran winning by 15.28 minutes. In race two, a triangle, with  legs, the Challenger crossed the finishing line ahead by 5.26 minutes.

Multi One Design MOD 70 
A one-design  multihull designed to create a new class of oceangoing racer. When compared to its predecessor the ORMA 60. the MOD 70 is  longer,  narrower, carries less sailarea with a shorter rig and higher crossbeam clearance. The design concept was to sacrifice some of the ORMA 60's extreme performance for reduced cost, reliability and safety.

References

External links 
 
 Vendee Globe
 Imoca 60
 Guillaume Verdier
 World Sailing Speed Record Council

 
French yacht designers
America's Cup yacht designers
Multihull designers